Dejan Bogdanovic (Originally: Дејан Богдановић or Dejan Bogdanović) (birthdate unknown) is a Serbian and Italian violinist.

Early life
Bogdanovic comes from an artistic family. His grandfather, a famous sculptor from Belgrade,  graduated from the Academy of Fine Arts in Paris and there met Pablo Picasso with whom a he was a friend.

His father is a well-known painter and writer; exhibitions of his works have had a great following at home and abroad (his works have been shown many times at the Biennale di Venezia) and his books of poems and prose have been translated into numerous European languages.

From an early age, Dejan showed a remarkable inclination for music and began his studies at the "Isidor Bajić" school of music in his hometown, Novi Sad, one of the most prestigious cultural centres of the Ex-Yugoslavia (Vojvodina). At the "Baic" institute he was a pupil of two well-known teachers, Maestro R. Kovac and Maestro J. Furman and soon after he was accepted for the S.Z.M.T. (School for Gifted Children), the only one of its kind and under the patronage of the President of the Republic.

As a soloist of this school and at only eleven years old, Dejan Bogdanovic performed in important concert halls in Yugoslavia and in Spain, France, Germany and England and during the forthcoming years won many times the "First Prize for Young Violinists". At seventeen years old he performed Paganini's first violin concerto and Felix Mendelssohn's E minor concerto with the Dubrovnik Symphony Orchestra.

Since then he has been soloist with many symphony and chamber orchestras, in his home country and abroad (symphony orchestras of Prague, Vienna, Belgrade, Zagreb, Sarajevo, Kuhmo, Moscow and many others).

After brilliantly passing special exams he was admitted, as the youngest pupil, to the University of Novi Sad (violin faculty). There was intense artistic activity during these university years, studying at this time with well-known teachers of the Russian school such as Eugenia Cugaeva, Marina  Jasvili, Ilya Grubert and above all with Zinaida Gilels with whom the maestro had a strong connection and apart from a close professional collaboration also had a profound friendship unfortunately ending with the death of the great Russian pedagogue.

Winner of various scholarships he has worked together with exceptional artists such as N. Braining, J.J. Kantaroff, A. Balakerskaya, O. Kagan.

Career
Study and specialization, even though very engaging,  did not impede his intensive concert activity; in fact, in just two years, apart from numerous recitals with pianoforte, Bogdanovic performed violin concertos by Henryk Wieniawski, Niccolò Paganini, Ludwig van Beethoven (Triple Concerto), Wolfgang Amadeus Mozart, Henri Vieuxtemps, Max Bruch under the baton of Lev Markiz, Igor Djadrov, Mladen Jagust, T. Ninic, M. Horvat and, when the programme permitted,  played as soloist  and directed at the same time.

In 1985, the European music year and year of Bach, Handel, and Scarlatti, in Vienna a special violin competition was organized in which Dejan Bogdanovic was invited to take part along with 40 other violinists from all over the world. Excelling in the various tests and playing Mozart's Concerto no. 5 for violin and orchestra he won, with a special mention, the first prize.

Two years later he won the first prize at the Yugoslav National Competition for Artists: this prestigious prize has only been given to 3 violinists in the last 50 years and after the transformation of the ex Yugoslavia has never again been assigned.

In 1988 he was invited along with another musician, the pianist Ivo Pogorelić, to the Festival Culturale di San Cirillo and San Matteo (fathers of the Cyrillic alphabet) under the patronage of the Santo Padre, and played the first of only two concerts that were programmed for the manifestation.

After a touneé as soloist in the former U.S.S.R., requested and organized by the Soviet Union, he had the good fortune to meet up with the world-famous violinist Viktor Tretiakov and under his guidance with only three other pupils specialized at the P.I. Tchaikovsky Conservatory in Moscow. Tretiakov said about him: "Dejan is a musician of great refinement and artistry. Much of this is due to the originality and fullness of his musical ideas and to his complete control of every period in music... His deep creative feelings always communicate to me something new... Dejan is, without doubt, the herald of the new age of violinists."

During these two years, he played Tchaikovsky's violin concerto in Moscow, Mozart's concerto no. 5 in Prague (Smetana Hall) and Paganini's first violin concerto in Portogruaro. On his return to his homeland he was offered the professorship of violin and at just 21 years old became the youngest teacher at the University of Novi Sad.

He has been a guest artist to many international festivals including the Kuhmo International Chamber Festival (Finland), Dubrovačke ljetne igre (Croatia), Portogruaro Music Festival (Italy), Festival del Veneto (Italy), "G. Mahler" Festival, "Casals" Music Festival (France), Pays de Gex (France), Festival di Roma "Ciril and Metodie" playing with artists such as J.J. Kantaroff, A. Libermann, E.v. Kulen, K. Bogino, T. Zetmayer, O. Kagan, V. Mendelsohnn, A. Munier.

He has recorded for national television in Austria, France, Italy, Yugoslavia, Canada, Finland, Spain, and Russia.

With the famous Russian pianist, Anna Balakerskaya, he has done recital work in Canada (Montreal), in the former Soviet Union, in Yugoslavia, and in England.

In 1993 because of the war that devastated the former Yugoslav nation he left his home country and decided to settle in Italy where he had already held master classes. Since living in Italy he has divided his time between his concert activities, playing in the great halls of Italy and Europe, and teaching; In fact he has held numerous courses in Bolzano, Siracusa, Padova, Portogruaro, Trieste, Salerno, Pesaro, Chioggia, Bergamo and his pupils are the prize winners of many important violin and orchestral manifestations and competitions.

Later life
During the years 2000 and 2001 he has been artistic director for the concert season of  "Camera della Musica" in Forlì and in this role as director, for the excellent results achieved in preparing  the orchestra "Bruno Maderna" and for the brilliant  performances of the various concerts he roused a considerable success from the public and  favourable media reports. In December 2002,  also as a soloist, he directed the Pesaro Symphony Orchestra in the Teatro Rossini playing the concerto for violin and orchestra by Richard Strauss.

Since the year 1992, he lives in Venice, Italy. At the moment he teaches at the Academy of High Specialization in Bergamo, Italy

Style and image
For many years Dejan has combined his role as a soloist together with a close collaboration with the well-known pianist Maria Gabriele Vianello, giving many concerts in Italy and in Europe. Among their appearances we remember the concert at the Festival of Feldkirch in Austria, the Veneto Festival (Italy) the concert at the festival of Cervo, the important international festival founded by Sandor Vegh at which have appeared some of the most famous names in classical music over the last 40 years.

His musical repertoire is vast and goes from all forms of chamber music to contemporary music. He has played and up till today still plays in the most diverse chamber music groups, in particular with pianoforte in which he has dedicated a particular study and personal research. As a soloist he has played the most famous concertos for violin and orchestra by Bach, Mozart, Beethoven, Mendelssohn, Respighi, Camille Saint-Saëns, Paganini, Wieniawski, Tchaikovsky, Sibelius, Vieuxtemps and many others.

See also
 List of contemporary classical violinists

References

External links 
 Official web site

Serbian classical violinists
Male classical violinists
Academic staff of the University of Novi Sad
University of Novi Sad alumni
Year of birth missing (living people)
Living people
21st-century classical violinists
21st-century male musicians